Neocoptodera is a genus of beetles in the family Carabidae, containing the following species:

 Neocoptodera alluaudi (Jeannel, 1949)  
 Neocoptodera championi (Murray, 1857) 
 Neocoptodera crassicornis (Fairmaire, 1897) 
 Neocoptodera crucifera (Dejean, 1831) 
 Neocoptodera inermis (Alluaud, 1897) 
 Neocoptodera notata (Boheman, 1848)  
 Neocoptodera overlaeti (Burgeon, 1937) 
 Neocoptodera similata (Hansen, 1968) 
 Neocoptodera tetraspilota (Fairmaire, 1887)
 Neocoptodera tetrastigma (Fairmaire, 1901) 
 Neocoptodera uelensis (Burgeon, 1937)

References

Lebiinae